Paul Cardona (born 22 January 1953) is a Roman Catholic clergyman who serves as the Episcopal vicar for the Clergy for the Diocese of Gozo. Prior to this he was the Archpriest of the Basilica of St George in Victoria, Gozo from 2007 to 2016.

Early years
Paul Cardona was born on 22 January, 1953 in Sannat, Gozo, Malta to Luigi Cardona and Rosina Sciberras. He attended the primary school of Sannat and the secondary school in Victoria, Gozo. He went on to enter the major Seminary of the Sacred Heart in Victoria, Gozo to study Philosophy in 1971 and Theology in 1973. He was ordained priest by Bishop Nikol Joseph Cauchi Nicholas Cauchi]] on 18 June, 1977 in the Cathedral of the Assumption in Victoria.

Time in Italy
In September 1977 Cardona left for Italy where he started his ministry in the Diocese of Tivoli. On 4 December, 1977 he was appointed parish priest of the parish of St Philip Neri in Colle Fiorito di Guidonia. During his time in this parish Cardona built a pastoral complex for the parish use. Cardona served in this parish until May 1989.

On 1 April, 1989 Cardinal Ugo Poletti appointed Cardona as parish priest of the parish of San Liboria in Rome. Cardona built a church and parish centre dedicated to St Liborius. It was consecrated on 7 November, 1998 followed by a visit by Pope John Paul II on 17 January, 1999. In 1997 Cardona was nominated as Prefect of the eleven prefectures of the Diocese of Rome by Cardinal Camillo Ruini. Moreover, in May 2000 he was appointed as a member of the Commission of Sacred Art of the Diocese of Rome.

Archpriest of St George's
On 17 September, 2007, Cardona was appointed Archpriest of the parish of St George in Victoria, Gozo by Bishop Mario Grech. He succeeded Dr. Joseph Farrugia as Archpriest. Cardona was installed as Archpriest of the parish on 4 November, 2007. He was appointed as Episcopal vicar for the Clergy on 4 November, 2016.

References

1953 births
Living people
20th-century Maltese Roman Catholic priests
21st-century Maltese Roman Catholic priests
People from Sannat